Zassenhaus is a German surname. Notable people with the surname include:

 Hans Zassenhaus (1912–1991), German mathematician
 Zassenhaus algorithm
 Zassenhaus group
 Zassenhaus lemma
 Hiltgunt Zassenhaus (1916–2004), German philologist who aided Scandinavian prisoners during World War II, sister of Hans Zassenhaus

See also
 Brauerei Zassenhaus, a German brewery in Velbert (see :de:Brauerei Zassenhaus)

German-language surnames